Coon Creek is a stream in Lincoln
and Warren counties in the U.S. state of Missouri. It is a tributary of Big Creek.

Coon Creek was named for the abundance of raccoons in the area.

See also
List of rivers of Missouri

References

Rivers of Lincoln County, Missouri
Rivers of Warren County, Missouri
Rivers of Missouri